Following are the results of the 2011 Singapore Women's Tennis Exhibition, a women's exhibition tennis tournament organized at the end of each season.

Players
Anabel Medina Garrigues had withdrawn and tournament organisers wished to find a top 10 player to replace her, and being unable to do so, contacted Medina Garrigues and was reconfirmed. All the players, except for Pennetta, competed in an end-of-year event.

Withdrawn players

Head to head
Below are the head-to-head records as they approached the tournament.

Draw

Tennis in Singapore
Singapore Women's Exhibition
Women's Tennis Exhibition